The 1905 Melbourne Cup was a two-mile handicap horse race which took place on Tuesday, 7 November 1905.

This race saw a 26-horse field compete. Jockey Frank Bullock had returned to Australia three weeks earlier and has not intended to ride in the race. He got a ride on Blue Spec after Normon Godby who had ridden Blue Spec to victory in Moonee Valley Cup choose to ride Gladsome. Blue Spec had previously won the Kalgoorlie Cup and Perth Cup and triumphed for owner Paddy Connolly in a race record time of 3 minutes 27.5 seconds.

This is the list of placegetters for the 1905 Melbourne Cup.

See also

 Melbourne Cup
 List of Melbourne Cup winners
 Victoria Racing Club

References

External links
1905 Melbourne Cup Field footyjumpers.com

1905
Melbourne Cup
Melbourne Cup
20th century in Melbourne
1900s in Melbourne